Raj Kalesh is an Indian magician, chef, TV host, stage choreographer and performer hailMing from Trivandrum, Kerala. He has been the host of various shows for national channels, but almost all channels in Malayalam. He has also appeared in films, with notable roles in movies such as Sapthamashree Thaskaraha, Ustad Hotel and Lord Livingstone 7000 Kandi. He is also known for Udan Panam.

The making of Raj Kalesh
 Television Career

References

Indian chefs
Indian choreographers
Indian magicians
1978 births
Living people